"You Haven't Seen the Last of Me" is a song performed by American singer-actress Cher, taken from the soundtrack Burlesque: Original Motion Picture Soundtrack of the accompanying film Burlesque (2010). After a long time of hiatus in her acting career, Cher returned to the screen in Burlesque, which co-stars Christina Aguilera. It was released to adult contemporary radio station in the United States on January 15, 2011, as the first single from the soundtrack by RCA Records. Prior to the release, a remix EP which includes uptempo dance versions of the song was made available to purchase iTunes Stores on November 24, 2010. Written by Diane Warren and produced by Matt Serletic and Mark Taylor, "You Haven't Seen the Last of Me" is a power ballad.

Upon its release, the single was well-received from most contemporary music critics, who praised Cher's comeback as well as the track's composition. It garnered Warren a Golden Globe Award for Best Original Song at the 68th Golden Globe Awards (2011), and was nominated for Best Song Written for Visual Media at the 54th Grammy Awards. On January 20, 2011, the track peaked at number one on the Billboard Hot Dance Club Songs chart, making Cher the only musical act to have a number-one single on a Billboard chart in each of the last six decades. Since its release, "You Haven't Seen the Last of Me" has been covered by James Franco and others.

Background and release
Following a long time of hiatus in her acting career, Cher was announced to be returned on the musical film Burlesque (2010) co-starring Christina Aguilera. This was the first time Cher appeared on the screen since Stuck on You (2003). Talking about the making of the film, Cher revealed, "It’s harder to do things. I've beat my body up so badly, it's amazing it's still talking to me and listening to what I say. But I’ve got aches and pains everywhere." The soundtrack was also revealed, with eight songs performed by Aguilera, and two songs by Cher: "Welcome to Burlesque" and "You Haven't Seen the Last of Me". During an interview with a California journal, Cher commented about "You Haven't Seen the Last of Me", "That song, for me, had a lot of meaning. It reminded me that I have to kind of move over." She also spoke about the track with the Fresno Bee, saying "Not that I'm doing it gracefully, because you'd have to pull me over kicking and screaming." In the United States, the song was released to adult contemporary radio stations on January 15, 2011 the first single from the soundtrack. In order to promote the song, several promotional remixes were made by Almighty, Dave Aude and StoneBridge. The remix EP, which contains uptempo dance versions of the track, was released onto iTunes Stores on November 24, 2010. The remix done by StoneBridge was released as a single on December 7, 2010. The song is also included on the deluxe edition of Cher's 25th studio album, Closer to the Truth.

Since its release, "You Haven't Seen the Last of Me" was covered by American actor James Franco, the co-host at the 83rd Academy Awards (2010). Gregory Ellwood for Hitfix called the cover "a great listen".

Composition and reception

Composed in the key of F minor, it has a larghetto tempo of 62,5 beats per minute. Cher's vocals on the track span from the low-note of Ab3 to the high-note of D5.

Upon its release, critical response to "You Haven't Seen the Last of Me" was favorable. Jim Farber for the New York Daily News praised the track, calling it "a show-stopper with the tailor-made" and "takes nothing away from the sweep of the tune – or from the star's to-the-rafters performance". Bill Lamp for About.com gave it a positive review, labeling it "a mega power ballad". Frank Bruni for The New York Times commented that the song "proclaims that she’s "far from over". Tina Mrazik for Associated Content labelled it "ultimate", while Ann Hornaday for The Washington Post picked "You Haven't Seen the Last of Me" as well as "Bound to You" as the two power ballads that "[land] with such powerful force". Alissa LeClair for the website Movie Buzzers called the song "Cher's peak" throughout the movie and said that it "conveys how important Cher is both on screen and on the music charts, transcending any previous doubts that Cher was no longer relevant in her sixty-fourth year". AFP of The Independent commented that the song "has particular poignancy at this moment in her career". At the 68th Golden Globe Awards (2011), "You Haven't Seen the Last of Me" earned Warren a Golden Globe Award for Best Original Song. It was also nominated for Best Song Written for Visual Media at the 54th Grammy Awards.

Chart performance
On January 20, 2011, "You Haven't Seen the Last of Me" peaked at number one on the Hot Dance Club Songs chart. This made Cher the only act to have notched a number-one single on a Billboard chart in each of the last six decades. By the end of 2011, the single was the 33rd best-performing dance single in the United States, according to Billboard. On October 25, 2013, the song spent its first week in the Australian Singles Chart at number 91.

Charts

Weekly charts

Year-end charts

Release history

See also
 List of number-one dance singles of 2011 (U.S.)

References

2010s ballads
2010 singles
Best Original Song Golden Globe winning songs
Cher songs
Pop ballads
RCA Records singles
Song recordings produced by Matt Serletic
Songs written by Diane Warren
2010 songs